These Hopeful Machines is the sixth studio album by American electronic musician BT. Released on February 1, 2010, the album sees collaborations with the likes of JES, Rob Dickinson, Christian Burns and Kirsty Hawkshaw, also featuring a cover of "The Ghost in You" by The Psychedelic Furs. Because some tracks exceed 10 minutes in length, the album spans two discs with six tracks on each. In an effort to make the album more accessible to casual listeners, the record was eventually re-issued as a single-disc version with shorter tracks, titled These Humble Machines. In addition, the album would later spawn a double disc remix edition titled These Re-Imagined Machines, also featured as a "Limited Collector's Edition Box Set". With great reception from critics, the album was nominated for the 2011 Grammy Awards under Best Electronic/Dance Album.

Background
On June 9, 2009, the first part of the single "The Rose of Jericho" was released on Beatport, and the second (and last) part was released on June 23, 2009. Five remixes were released in all in these two parts along with BT's 'Deus Ex Machina Album Mix'. The next single, "Every Other Way" was released on December 22, 2009. The third single of the album, "Suddenly", was the last to be released, on January 12, 2010 for digital-download only. Since the album release, the fourth and fifth singles, "Forget Me" and "The Emergency", were released on June 14, 2010 and September 28, 2010, respectively. The album was mastered by Joe LaPorta.

BT chose to release the album online to digital retailers as two large tracks to preserve the feel of an album. On release day, an MP3 exclusive version of These Hopeful Machines was offered by Amazon which included a bonus remix of "Always", by Chicane. This download was available as 2 full A/B side tracks instead of the 12 individual album tracks. The album was nominated for the 2011 Grammy Awards under "Best Electronic/Dance Album".

Reception

USA Today: "...even techno-phobes will be seduced by (BT's) forward-thinking musicality."

Allmusic: "These Hopeful Machines doesn't try to convince, it's meant to reward the already converted with a vast wonderland of melodic glitch and prolonged bliss."

Wired: "If you've never liked electronica before, this is the release that could change your mind."

Sinning in LA: "Both discs offer compelling rides from start to finish."

Track listing

Personnel
Disc one
 Track 1: Vocals by BT and Christian Burns.
 Track 2: Vocals by BT. Background vocals by Christian Burns. Additional production by Andrew Bayer.
 Track 3: Vocals by JES. Background vocals by BT and Christian Burns.
 Track 4: Vocals by JES.
 Track 6: Vocals by BT and Christian Burns. End chorus sung by Kaia Transeau.

Disc two
 Track 1: Vocals by Kirsty Hawkshaw. Background vocals by BT. Additional production by Ulrich Schnauss.
 Track 2: Vocals by BT. Background vocals by Christian Burns.
 Track 3, 5: Vocals by Rob Dickinson.
 Track 6: Vocals by BT. Background vocals by Amelia June.

Release history

References

External links
 

2010 albums
BT (musician) albums
Black Hole Recordings albums